Beit Hasan is a Palestinian village in the Nablus Governorate in the North central West Bank, located 14 kilometers east of Nablus. According to the Palestinian Central Bureau of Statistics (PCBS), the village had a population of 891 inhabitants in mid-year 2006.

References

External links
Welcome To Bayt Hasan
Survey of Western Palestine, Map 12:   IAA, Wikimedia commons
Beit Hasan Village profile,  Applied Research Institute–Jerusalem (ARIJ) 
Beit Hasan, aerial photo, ARIJ
Development Priorities and Needs in Beit Hasan, ARIJ

Nablus Governorate
Villages in the West Bank
Municipalities of the State of Palestine